Fabrice Dupont, better known as 'Fabulous' Fab Dupont, is a French mixing engineer, record producer and teacher. He was born in Canada but his parents moved back to France when he was a toddler. Growing up in Paris, he studied music theory and saxophone before moving to Boston, Massachusetts where he attended Berklee College of Music, majoring in Songwriting. As a self-taught engineer and producer, Dupont uses a hybrid of both analog and digital technology to create records for artists such as Shakira, Jennifer Lopez, Bebel Gilberto, Freshlyground, David Crosby, Wakey Wakey, Vicente Garcia, Juan Luis Guerra, Nat King Cole, Visitante and many others. As a consultant, Dupont has worked with manufacturers such as Lauten Audio, Presonus, George Massenburg Labs, Dangerous Music, Avid, Sonnox, and Universal Audio to troubleshoot, create, distribute and promote audio systems.

Fab Dupont is the owner of Flux Studios in New York City as well as co-owner of PureMix.net, an educational website for production and recording techniques.

He also played in showitme fc as a central defender, remembered for his classic scream POR AFUERA

Other projects
Dupont worked closely with Lauten Audio founder Brian Loudenslager in the development of the Lauten Atlantis microphone and the Lauten Eden microphone in order to create a design that would be versatile enough to handle the rigors of the modern DAW-based recording environment.

Production credits
Selected Production Credits:

References

French record producers
Living people
Year of birth missing (living people)